Caularis jamaicensis is a moth of the family Noctuidae first described by Todd in 1966. It is found on Jamaica.

References

Moths described in 1966
Agaristinae